Michael Wray may refer to:

 Michael H. Wray, Democratic politician from North Carolina
 the winner of Hell's Kitchen (U.S. season 1)

See also
Mike Ray, Canadian politician